Hypsopygia camerounalis is a species of snout moth in the genus Hypsopygia. It was described by Patrice J.A. Leraut in 2006 and is known from Cameroon, from which its species epithet is derived.

References

Moths described in 2006
Endemic fauna of Cameroon
Moths of Africa
Pyralini